The Battle for Mexico City refers to the series of engagements from September 8 to September 15, 1847, in the general vicinity of Mexico City during the Mexican–American War. Included are major actions at the battles of Molino del Rey and Chapultepec, culminating with the fall of Mexico City. The U.S. Army under Winfield Scott won a major victory that ended the war.

Background
The major objective of American operations in central Mexico had been the capture of Mexico City. After capturing the port of Veracruz in March, General Winfield Scott was able to secure a base and move inland and defeat a large Mexican force at the Battle of Cerro Gordo. After routing the Mexicans at the Battle of Churubusco, Scott's army was less than eight kilometers (five miles) away from its objective of Mexico City.

Battles

Molino del Rey

On September 8, the fight for Mexico City began. General Scott believed that a cannon foundry was located at the Molino del Rey, known as the King's Mill, located just over three kilometers (two miles) outside the city. Scott sent the 1st Division under William J. Worth to seize and destroy the foundry. Worth wished to include Chapultepec Castle in his attack, and when Scott refused, a bitter rivalry began between Scott and Worth. In the ensuing battle, both sides suffered heavy casualties, and Worth drove the Mexicans from the mill, separating them from the forces at Chapultepec. The battle produced no significant military gains for the U.S.

Chapultepec

The main assault on the city came a few days later on September 12. Mexico City was guarded in part by Chapultepec Castle, which was being used as a military academy. Scott preceded an infantry assault with an all day artillery barrage on September 12. The next day, September 13, the 4th Division, under John A. Quitman, spearheaded the attack against Chapultepec and carried the castle. Future Confederate generals George E. Pickett and James Longstreet participated in the attack. Serving in the Mexican defense were the cadets later immortalized as Los Niños Héroes (the "Boy Heroes"). The Mexican forces fell back from Chapultepec and retreated within the city.

Attacks on the Belén and San Cosme Gates
Quitman's Division made its way down the Belén Causeway towards the Belén Gate, defended by General Terres & Colonel Garay with the 2d Mexico Activos (200 men) and 3 guns ( 1-12 lbs. & 2-8 lbs.), while Worth's Division further to the north made its way up La Verónica Causeway towards the San Cosme Gate, defended by General Rangel's Infantry Brigade (Granaderos Battalion (Adj. A. Manero), 1st Light(Comdte. L. Marquez), part 3d Light (Lt.Col. M.M. Echeagaray)and parts of Matamoros, Morelia and Santa Ana Battalions (Col. J.V. Gonzalez) with 3 guns (1-12 lb, 1-8 lb. and 1 howitzer 24 lbs. Quitman was merely supposed to make a feint towards the city, but he pushed forward his whole division and broke through the defenses. Santa Anna arrived at the Belén Gate in a fury and relieved the front commander. Worth's Division in the meantime had a slow start against the Mexicans after beating off a Mexican cavalry attack. When he reached San Cosme, he found its defenses ill-prepared, but the Mexicans defending it fought well before falling back. Ulysses S. Grant found his way into the action along the causeway on Worth's front and helped in hoisting a cannon into the belltower of a nearby church. From this spot Grant fired into the defenders below. When the fighting subsided on all fronts, both gates had fallen and the Mexicans had withdrawn into the city. Other gates defended were: San Antonio by General M. Martínez ( 3d & 4th Ligero & 11th Line with 10 guns ) before withdrawing; Nino Perdido by the National Guards and 2 guns; and San Lázaro, Guadalupe and Villejo, which were defended by small infantry detachments. Other forces were stationed at la Piedad (1st & 2d Mexico Activos and Guanajunto Battalions), the Insurgente bridge (Gen. Arguelles : Invalidos and Lagos Battalion) and in the rear of these (Gen. Ramirez with 2d Ligero and various pickets) before withdrawing to the Citadel.

Fall of Mexico City

The Junta (Gens. Alcorta, Carrera, Lombardini & Fran. Pérez) had withdrawn their army: 14 Guns, 4,000 Cavalry (Quijano & Andrade Brigades), and 5,000 Infantry (Four Sections: 1) Gov. Olaguibel: Toluca National Guards, 2) Cmdte. Arroyo: Lagos, Iturbide, & Tula Battalions, 3) Gen. Martínez: various pickets, and 4) Gen. Pérez: 11th Infantry & remnants of Light Regts.) from the city during the night, and the U.S. forces, expecting another assault, found the city undefended. Worth and Quitman advanced cautiously. Quitman sent Lieutenant Pierre Beauregard to arrange the surrender of the ciudadela. Beauregard and Mansfield Lovell were met by a Mexican officer who asked for a receipt for the captured ciudadela.( 15 Guns) Beauregard exclaimed that "we give receipts at the point of their swords". Scott gave the honor of formally entering the city to Quitman's Division. The conquering army was less than impressing, the troops wore ragged and bloodstained uniforms and Quitman only had on one shoe when he marched into the city. Quitman marched into the Zócalo plaza in the center of the city in front of the National Palace where the formal surrender took place. As Worth's division entered the city the leading unit was John Garland's brigade.

Stragglers from the Mexican army left in the city after Santa Anna's withdrawal climbed to the roofs of houses and began shooting at the American soldiers. General Garland was hit in the chest with the first shot and fell severely wounded. Before he evacuated, Santa Anna released 30,000 prisoners into the streets of the city, and these rooftop shots provoked the prisoners into similar acts. Worth did manage to get the shooting under control. William S. Harney's dragoons escorted General Scott into the city wearing his immaculate dress uniform and was greeted by patriotic music. Scott appointed the politically savvy Quitman as military governor, becoming the only American to ever rule from the National Palace.

Order of battle

United States
US Army – Major General Winfield Scott

Mexico
7 August 1847—20,210 men and 104 artillery pieces acs

Mexican Army General Antonio López de Santa Anna

Chief of Artillery: General Martin Carrera
 Commandante general-Col.Jose Gil Partearroyo
 Foot Artillery Battalion-Col. Aguado
 Cavalry Art. Battalion-Iglesias
Chief of Engineers: General Ignacio Mora y Villamil
 Gens. Casimiro Liceaga, Monterde and Miguel Blanco
 Army of the East General Manuel Lombardini
 1st Brigade General Andres Terres (1st Activos, Lakes and 2nd Light Battalions)
 2nd  Brigade General Mariano Martinez (Morelia Activos, Invalids Corps)
 3rd  Brigade General Joaquin Rangel (Mixto Sta Anna, Morelia National Guards)
 4th Brigade General Francisco Perez (1st, 3rd & 4th Light, 11th Infantry)
 5th Brigade General Antonio Leon (Oajaca & Querétaro Activos, 10th Infantry, Querétaro & Mina National Guards)
 6th Brigade General Pedro María de Anaya (Independencia, Bravos, Victoria & Hidalgo National Guards)
 7th Brigade Col. Anastasio Zerecero (Acapulco, parts Tlapa & Libertad pickets)
 Army of the North General Gabriel Valencia deputy Gen. Mariano Salas 3,000 Infantry, 1,000 Cavalry & 500 Artillery
 Vanguard Brigade General Francisco Mejia ( 700 infantry: Fijo de Mexico, Potosi Activos,400 cavalry: 7th Cavalry) and 3-12 lbs guns & 4 howitzers.
 Centre Brigade General Anastasio Parrodi ( 1,500 infantry: 10th and 11th Infantry, Tampico Coast Guards, Querétaro, Celaya and Guanajuato Activos, Celaya Auxiliary) and 6-8 lbs guns and 2 howitzers.
 Reserve Brigade General Mariano Salas ( 800 infantry: Engineers, Mixto Santa Anna, Aguascalientes Activos, 400 cavalry: 2nd, 3rd & 8th Cavalry, Guanajuato Cavalry) and 7 light guns.
 Army of the South General Juan Álvarez 2,762 Cavalry
 Cavalry Division (GMT Games lists:
 Alvarez Brigade-2d,3d,5th & 9th Line Casvalry, Tulancingo Cuirassiers
 Andrade Brigade-Oaxaca and Michoacan Cavalry Battalions

Alcaraz, Ramon "Apuntes para la historia de la guerra entre Mexico...†

Casualties

September 8
 U.S. 116 killed, 665 wounded, 17 missing, 789 total
 Mexican 2,700 total

September 12–15
 U.S. 130 killed, 703 wounded, 29 missing, 862 total
 Mexican 1,800 killed and wounded, 823 captured, 2,623 total

Totals
 U.S. 1,651
 Mexican 5,323

See also
 Battle of Molino del Rey
 Battles of the Mexican–American War
 Marines' hymn
 Mexican–American War
 Mexican Cession
 Saint Patrick's Battalion

Notes
 Lieutenant Colonel James S. McIntosh temporarily commanded Clarke's brigade at Molino del Rey; Clarke returned to command after McIntosh was killed during the fighting.

References

 Arndt, Jochen S., “The True Napoleon of the West: General Winfield Scott’s Mexico City Campaign and the Origins of the U.S. Army’s Combined-Arms Combat Division,” Journal of Military History, 76 (July 2012), 649–71.
 Bauer, K. Jack, The Mexican–American War, 1846–48
 Nevin, David; editor, The Mexican War (1978)
 Alcaraz, Ramon et al. Apuntes Para la Historia de la Guerra entre Mexico y los Estados Unidos.
 Annual Reports 1894, War Department lists trophy guns: 1- 12 pounder and 2- 4 pounders.

External links
 Winfield Scott's Official Report
 Irish fighters
 A Continent Divided: The U.S. - Mexico War, Center for Greater Southwestern Studies, the University of Texas at Arlington

Battle
1847 in Mexico
History of Mexico City
Battle
United States Marine Corps in the 18th and 19th centuries
September 1847 events
Mexican–American War orders of battle
1847 in the Mexican-American War